1,8-Naphthalic anhydride is an organic compound with the formula C10H6(C2O3).  It is one of three isomers of naphthalic anhydride, the other two being the 1,2- and the 2,3-derivatives.  The 1,8-isomer is prepared by aerobic oxidation of acenaphthene.   2,6-naphthalenedicarboxylic acid can be prepared from this anhydride. 1,8-Naphthalic anhydride is a precursor to the 4-chloro and 4,5-dichloro derivatives.  These chloride groups are susceptible to displacement by amines and alkoxides, giving rise, ultimately, to a large family of naphthalimides, which are used as optical brighteners.

Derivatives include: Alrestatin,...

References

Carboxylic anhydrides
Naphthalenes